Jam Khan Shoro is a Pakistani politician who has been a Member of the Provincial Assembly of Sindh since August 2018. Previously he was member of the Sindh Assembly from May 2013 to May 2018.

Early life and education

 Hyderabad, Pakistan.

Political career

He was elected to the Provincial Assembly of Sindh as a candidate of Pakistan Peoples Party (PPP) from Constituency PS-47 (Hyderabad-III) in 2013 Pakistani general election.
 In June 2013, he was inducted into Sindh's provincial cabinet of Chief Minister Syed Qaim Ali Shah and was made Provincial Minister of Sindh for livestock and fisheries. In November 2015, Provincial Minister of Sindh for local government.

In July 2016, he was into Sindh's provincial cabinet of Chief Minister Syed Murad Ali Shah and was made Provincial Minister of Sindh for local government.

He was re-elected to Provincial Assembly of Sindh as a candidate of PPP from Constituency PS-62 (Hyderabad-I) in 2018 Pakistani general election.

References

Living people
Sindh MPAs 2013–2018
1982 births
Pakistan People's Party MPAs (Sindh)
Sindh MPAs 2018–2023